The 1946 National Challenge Cup was the 33rd edition of the United States Football Association's annual open cup. The Chicago Viking F.C. defeated the Ponta Delgada S.C. to win.

External links
 1946 National Challenge Cup – TheCup.us

Lamar Hunt U.S. Open Cup
U.S. Open Cup